Arthur R. "Art" Thompson (born 1938 in Seattle) is a former CEO of the John Birch Society. He took office in 2005 after launching a "coup" with the support of the organization's former president John McManus.  He was replaced as CEO by Bill Hahn in 2020. 

Thompson is also CEO of FreedomProject Education, the educational arm of the American Opinion Foundation which is intended to provide online curriculum for students in grades 9 through 12 featuring an emphasis on "patriotism and the idea of American exceptionalism" which is "based on the foundation of Biblical belief" .

Earlier career
Before becoming head of the JBS, he had a long career as an anti-communist activist: he claims to have infiltrated Marxist organizations around his Seattle home in the 1960s. 

In his JBS Biography, Thompson is also credited with past membership in an unnamed small City Council, as the chairman of an unnamed local Chamber of Commerce, as a party official and an elector for the Republican Party, and as a Washington state citizen advocate for the Christian Coalition. The biography documents attendance but not graduation date or field of study from the University of Washington and the Washington Military Academy.

Views
Thompson believes that Russian communism remains a serious threat to the USA, and is responsible for much global terrorism including 9/11. He has claimed a number of Islamists including Ayman al-Zawahiri are or were communists.  He has criticised both mainstream Republicans and Tea Party figures such as Sarah Palin for failing to see the nature of the threat from Moscow. He also believes in a shadowy international conspiracy including such bodies as the Council on Foreign Relations, the Trilateral Commission and the Rockefeller family that threatens American interests.

Citations

1938 births
Living people
Activists from Seattle
American conspiracy theorists
John Birch Society members
People from Seattle
American chief executives